Oxbotica is an autonomous vehicle software company, headquartered in Oxfordshire, England, and founded by Paul Newman and Ingmar Posner.

History 

In 2013, Newman and Posner led the RobotCar UK project as part of Oxford University's Department of Engineering Science Mobile Robotics Group. RobotCar became the first autonomous vehicle on UK roads.

In 2014, the pair used the newly developed technology to found Oxbotica.

Oxbotica has raised over $18 million to date and is backed by the IP Group, Parkwalk Advisors and AXA XL. In 2018, Uber’s former Head of Business EMEA Fraser Robinson was appointed to the Board of Directors.

In May 2019, Ozgur Tohumcu replaced Dr Graeme Smith as Oxbotica's CEO.

In January 2021, Oxbotica announced it had raised $47 million in a Series B round. In January 2023, the company raised $140 million in a Series C round.

Technology 
Oxbotica’s full stack, end-to-end Universal Autonomy software is both vehicle and platform-agnostic, with no dependence on external infrastructure such as GPS. It can be deployed in any environment and on any terrain. In addition to underground uses, the technology is also useful in natural canyons and forests, where GPS signals are weak or non-existent, but also in "urban canyons" - cities with tall buildings that obstruct GPS signals for proper navigation.

Public deployments 

The LUTZ Pathfinder pod had its first public demonstration in February 2015 in Milton Keynes. The Government-funded project was designed to ensure that autonomous vehicles could comply with the Highway Code. The pod featured autonomous control software from Oxbotica, including 19 sensors, cameras, radar and Lidar.

As part of the GATEway Project in 2017, Oxbotica trialled seven autonomous shuttle buses in Greenwich, navigating a two-mile riverside path near London’s O2 Arena on a route also used by pedestrians and cyclists. Oxbotica ran the UK’s first trial of autonomous grocery deliveries with British online supermarket Ocado in London as the next evolution of the GATEway Project.

In 2018, Oxbotica deployed its autonomous vehicle software at London’s Gatwick Airport, which subsequently became the first airport in the world to trial an autonomous shuttle service. The electric-powered autonomous vehicles transported staff via airside roads between the airport’s North and South terminals. An airside trial of Oxbotica’s technology was then successfully completed at Heathrow Airport in partnership with IAG Cargo, the first airside trial of an autonomous vehicle at a UK airport. The Oxbotica-designed CargoPod ran autonomously along a cargo route around the airside perimeter for three weeks.

As part of the UK Centre for Connected and Autonomous Vehicles-funded DRIVEN project, Oxbotica is developing and deploying a fleet of Ford Fusion autonomous vehicles running in both London and Oxford on public roads, and in conjunction with its consortium partners, running real-time insurance. AXA XL is partnering with Oxbotica on the development of smart insurance products using Oxbotica’s autonomy technology to improve road safety.

In 2018, Oxbotica announced a partnership with London taxi firm Addison Lee to develop and deploy autonomous taxis in the city of London by 2021. A 3D street mapping exercise is already being conducted in London’s Canary Wharf.

In 2019, Oxbotica deployed a fleet of their autonomous technology within Ford Mondeo cars on public roads in Stratford, London to test their use in city environments. This £13.2m project is in collaboration with The DRIVEN Project to develop self-driving cars.

Awards 

2019

 Royal Academy of Engineering Silver Medal - Paul Newman

2017

 Financial Times ArcelorMittal Boldness in Business Award
 Barclays Award for Innovation

2016

 Frost & Sullivan Award, Technology Leadership for Autonomous Driving Software

References

External links

Robotics companies
Artificial intelligence laboratories